The  refers to Japanese aerial lift lines in Hatsukaichi, Hiroshima. This is the only route  operates. The company is a subsidiary of Hiroshima Electric Railway. The route, consisted of two lines, climbs Mount Misen of Miyajima Island. It opened in 1959. The route accepts PASPY, a smart card ticketing system.

Basic data

Momijidani Line
System: Gondola lift, 3 cables
Distance: 
Vertical interval: 
Maximum gradient: 26°24′
Operational speed: 2.0 m/s
Passenger capacity per a cabin: 8
Cabins: 22
Stations: 2
Time required for single ride: 10 minutes

Shishiiwa Line
System: Aerial tramway, 3 cables
Distance: 
Vertical interval: 
Maximum gradient: 15°13′
Operational speed: 3.6 m/s
Passenger capacity per a cabin: 30
Cabins: 2
Stations: 2
Time required for single ride: 3.5 minutes

See also
List of aerial lifts in Japan

External links
  Official Website (English)

Aerial tramways in Japan
Transport in Hiroshima Prefecture
Tourist attractions in Hiroshima Prefecture
1959 establishments in Japan